Anuj Kumar (born 24 July 1998) is an Indian professional footballer who plays as a goalkeeper for Indian Super League club Hyderabad.

Club career

Early life and youth career
Born in a small town called Eka in Uttar Pradesh, Anuj started playing school football after his family moved to Delhi. Later he joined Bhaichung Bhutia Football Schools and the AIFF Elite Academy.

In 2015, he joined Pune FC and played Youth League with Pune FC Academy team.

Pune City
After Pune FC dissolved in 2016, Anuj joined Indian Super League club Pune City. He won the 2017 IFA Shield with Pune City U19. He made the match-winning save against AIFF Elite Academy in semi-final penalty shoot-out.

Anuj was included in the Pune City senior team squad for the 2017–18 and 2018–19 ISL seasons, but didn't make any appearances.

Hyderabad FC
In 2019, Anuj joined newly formed Hyderabad ahead of the 2019–20 Indian Super League season, later loaned out to Indian Arrows in mid-season transfer window. On 30 September 2020, he signed a two-year extension with the club.  On 9 November 2022, he made his ISL debut as a substitute for Laxmikant Kattimani in a 0–1 away win against Jamshedpur.

Loan to Real Kashmir
On 2 November 2020, he was loaned out to Real Kashmir. On 5 March 2021, Anuj made his I-League debut against Churchill Brothers.

Loan to Aizwal FC
On 21 August 2021, Anuj joined I-League side Aizawl on a season-long loan deal. He made 10 appearances for the club in 2021–22 I-League.

International career
Anuj was a part of India under-16s which won the 2013 SAFF U-16 Championship.

Honours
India U16
 SAFF U-16 Championship: 2013

References

External links 
 Anuj Kumar at the ISL
 

1998 births
Living people
Indian footballers
FC Pune City players
Indian Super League players
Association football goalkeepers
Footballers from Uttar Pradesh
I-League players
India youth international footballers
Real Kashmir FC players
Aizawl FC players
Hyderabad FC players